Eugène Edine Pottier (4 October 1816 – 6 November 1887) was a French revolutionary, poet, freemason and transport worker.

Pottier was elected a member of the Paris municipal council - the Paris Commune, in March 1871. Following the Commune's defeat, in June 1871 he wrote the poem L'Internationale, which became the International Workingmen's Association anthem during its last years (1871–1876), and has been used by most socialist and left-wing political internationals since. Music was later written for the song by Pierre De Geyter. Encyclopedia of Mass Persuasion deems the anthem "one of the best-known propaganda songs since La Marseillaise". After writing the poem, Pottier went into exile but later returned to France, dying penniless.

Fifteen years after the Communards were crushed in blood by the Versaillais (1871), Eugène Pottier dedicated the following hymn to their revolution:

On l'a tuée à coups de chassepot,
A coups de mitrailleuse,
Et roulée avec son drapeau
Dans la terre argileuse.
Et la tourbe des bourreaux gras
Se croyait la plus forte.
Tout ça n'empêche pas, Nicolas
Qu'la Commune n'est pas morte.

An approximate translation of which is:

They killed her with their chassepot,
With their machine guns,
And rolled her with its flag
In the clay.
And the mud of the fat hangmen
thought they had prevailed.
And with all that, Nicolas,
The Commune is not dead.

Vladimir Lenin acknowledged the 25th anniversary of Pottier's death in a 1913 article in Pravda.

During his exile in New York City (1873–1880), Eugène Pottier was received at Les Égalitaires lodge in New York. In his cover letter, he said that Freemasonry "is composed of a group of freethinkers who, having made a clean sweep on tradition and recognizing nothing superior to human reason, consciously dedicate themselves in search of Truth and Justice".

References

External links

 
 
 

1816 births
1887 deaths
Writers from Paris
French socialists
Members of the International Workingmen's Association
Burials at Père Lachaise Cemetery
French Freemasons
French male writers
Communards